Huntingdon is a town in Carroll County, Tennessee, United States. The population was 4,439 at the 2020 census and 3,985 in 2010. It is the county seat of Carroll County.

History
European-American settlers named Huntingdon for Memucan Hunt, who first owned the town site in western Tennessee. Huntingdon was home to many prominent farming families. Prominent families in the area were the Ingrams and the Masseys, who had settled in the area as early as 1820.

Geography
Huntingdon is located slightly east of the center of Carroll County at  (36.007154, -88.420683).

Climate

Demographics

2020 census

As of the 2020 United States Census, there were 4,439 people, 1,492 households, and 947 families residing in the town.

2010 census
As of the census of July 2010, there were 3,985 people living in the town.

2000 census
As of the census of 2000, the population density was 387.8 people per square mile (149.7/km2). There were 1,950 housing units at an average density of 173.9 per square mile (67.1/km2). The racial makeup of the town was 80.52% White, 17.87% African American, 0.14% Native American, 0.11% Asian, 0.02% Pacific Islander, 0.11% from other races, and 1.22% from two or more races. Hispanic or Latino of any race were 0.62% of the population.

There were 1,752 households, out of which 30.1% had children under the age of 18 living with them, 51.4% were married couples living together, 14.4% had a female householder with no husband present, and 32.1% were non-families. 29.5% of all households were made up of individuals, and 16.0% had someone living alone who was 65 years of age or older. The average household size was 2.34 and the average family size was 2.88.

In the town, the population was spread out, with 23.3% under the age of 18, 7.2% from 18 to 24, 25.3% from 25 to 44, 23.2% from 45 to 64, and 21.0% who were 65 years of age or older. The median age was 41 years. For every 100 females, there were 84.1 males. For every 100 females age 18 and over, there were 79.4 males.

The median income for a household in the town was $27,625, and the median income for a family was $41,438. Males had a median income of $31,506 versus $20,081 for females. The per capita income for the town was $17,296. About 9.3% of families and 14.3% of the population were below the poverty line, including 19.2% of those under age 18 and 14.5% of those age 65 or over.

Media
Radio stations:
 WRQR-FM 105.5  "Today's Best Music with Ace & TJ in the Morning"
 WTPR-AM 710 "The Greatest Hits of All Time"
 WEIO 100.9 The Farm Home of the Country hits of Today and Yesterday

Newspapers:
 Carroll County News-Leader
 The McKenzie Banner
 Tennessee Magnet Publications

Recreation, sports, and entertainment
The town is the site of the Dixie Carter Performing Arts and Academic Enrichment Center, which serves as a premiere venue for the performing, literary, visual and media arts. It is named for Carroll County native Dixie Carter.

The New Carroll County Thousand Acre Recreation Lake is located on Hwy 70 West out of Huntingdon.

Notable people
Jessica Andrews, country music singer
Gordon Browning, governor of Tennessee from 1937 to 1939
Dixie Carter, film, television, and stage actress, best known for her role as Julia Sugarbaker in the CBS sitcom Designing Women
Carl Mann, rockabilly singer
George W. Murphy, governor of Arkansas
Tim Priest, former Tennessee football player and Vol Network color commentator
Timothy Tucker, former president of the American Pharmacists Association
Dallas Ellis, University of TN at Martin graduate, Philanthropist, States leading squirrel and raccoon trapper.

References

External links
 Town of Huntingdon official website
 Huntingdon page at City-Data.com

Towns in Carroll County, Tennessee
Towns in Tennessee
County seats in Tennessee